Sroka or SROKA can mean any of the following:

Sroka (surname)
 Second Republic of Korea Army
SZD-15 Sroka, a single-seat glider designed and built in Poland in 1956